Hindol is a village in the Bhiwani district of the Indian state of Haryana. , the village had 514 households with a total population of 2,564 of which 1,338 were male and 1,226 female.

References

Villages in Charkhi Dadri district